Scottish Gaelic orthography has evolved over many centuries and is heavily etymologizing in its modern form. This means the orthography tends to preserve historical components rather than operating on the principles of a phonemic orthography where the graphemes correspond directly to phonemes. This allows the same written form in Scottish Gaelic to result in a multitude of pronunciations, depending on the spoken variant of Scottish Gaelic. Conversely, it allows the sometimes highly divergent phonetic forms to be covered by a single written form, rather than requiring multiple written forms.

Alphabet 

The alphabet (Scottish Gaelic: , formerly  from the first three letters of the Ogham alphabet) now used for writing Scottish Gaelic consists of the following Latin script letters, whether written in Roman type or Gaelic type:

Vowels may be accented with a grave accent but accented letters are not considered distinct letters. However, since the 1981 GOC and its 2005 and 2009 revisions, standard orthography only uses the grave accent. Since the 1980s, the acute accent has not been used in Scottish high school examination papers, and many publishers have adopted the Scottish Qualifications Authority's orthographic conventions for their books. Despite this, traditional spelling is still used by some writers and publishers, although not always intentionally. In Nova Scotia, the 2009 Gaelic language curriculum guidelines follow the 2005 GOC orthography, but do not change the traditional spelling of words and phrases common to Nova Scotia or in pre–spelling-reform literature.

Letter names
The early Medieval treatise  ('The Scholars' Primer') describes the origin of alphabets from the Tower of Babel. It assigns plant names and meanings to the Ogham alphabet, to a lesser extent to Norse Younger Futhark runes, and by extension to Latin letters when used to write Gaelic. Robert Graves' book The White Goddess has been a major influence on assigning divinatory meanings to the tree symbolism. (See also Bríatharogam.) Some of the names differ from their modern equivalents (e.g. dair > darach, suil > seileach).

Consonants
The consonant letters generally correspond to the consonant phonemes as shown in this table. See Scottish Gaelic phonology for an explanation of the symbols used. A back vowel is one of the following; ; a front vowel is any other kind of vowel.

Vowels
Many of the rules in this section only apply in stressed syllables. In unstressed syllables, the range of vowels is highly restricted, with mainly /ə/, /ɪ/ or /a/ appearing and on occasion /ɔ/. Only certain vowel graphs appear in unstressed syllables:  and very infrequently .

Vowel-consonant combinations
 are commonly pronounced as vowels or are deleted if they are followed by a consonant.

Epenthetic vowels

Defunct combinations
The acute accent is no longer used in standard Scottish Gaelic orthography, although it may be encountered in late 20th century writings, and occasionally in contemporary writings, especially in Canadian Gaelic.

Certain spellings have also been regularised where they violate pronunciation rules. "Tigh" in particular can still be encountered in house names and certain place names, notably Tighnabruaich and Eilean Tigh.

  → 
  → 
  →

References

Sources
Bauer, Michael Blas na Gàidhlig - The Practical Guide to Gaelic Pronunciation (2011) Akerbeltz

External links
Gaelic Orthographic Conventions (2009), Scottish Qualifications Authority
A comprehensive critique of the "New" Gaelic Orthographic Conventions by a fluent speaker, originally published in the Stornoway Gazette

Scottish Gaelic language
Indo-European Latin-script orthographies